The Big Green Egg German Challenge is a golf tournament on the Challenge Tour held at Wittelsbacher Golf Club in Neuburg an der Donau, Bavaria, Germany.

Title sponsor Big Green Egg signed a sponsorship agreement for the German Challenge through 2023.

History
In the inaugural tournament, Ángel Hidalgo of Spain claimed his maiden Challenge Tour title by posting four consecutive rounds of 68, defying the odds after receiving a last-minute invite.

Alejandro del Rey won the following year, beating Mateusz Gradecki with a birdie at the second extra playoff hole.

Winners

References

External links
Coverage on the Challenge Tour's official site
https://german-challenge.de/live-scoring

Challenge Tour events
Golf tournaments in Germany